The following is a list of United States ambassadors, or other chiefs of mission, to Venezuela.  The title given by the United States State Department to this position is currently Ambassador Extraordinary and Minister Plenipotentiary. The ambassadors are posted at the Embassy of the United States, Caracas.

Ambassadors

See also
 United States – Venezuela relations
 Foreign relations of Venezuela
 Ambassadors of the United States

References
Specific

General
 United States Department of State: Background notes on Venezuela

External links
 United States Department of State: Chiefs of Mission for Venezuela
 United States Department of State: Venezuela
 United States Embassy in Caracus

Venezuela
Main
United States